The New Zealand cricket team toured Zimbabwe for a two-match Test series and a three-match One Day International (ODI) series between 18 September and 5 October 1997. The Test series was drawn 0–0 and the ODI series was drawn 1–1.

Test series

1st Test

2nd Test

ODI series

1st ODI

2nd ODI

3rd ODI

References

External links
 

1997 in New Zealand cricket
1997 in Zimbabwean cricket
International cricket competitions from 1997–98 to 2000
1997-98
Zimbabwean cricket seasons from 1980–81 to 1999–2000